Salia may refer to:

 Salia (moth), a genus of moths in the family Erebidae
 Salia, a character in the Star Trek: The Next Generation episode "The Dauphin"
 Sáile, a village in County Mayo, Ireland

People 
 Edward Salia (1952–2009), Ghanaian politician
 Flavius Salia, Roman consul
 Kalistrat Salia (1901–1986), Georgian historian and philologist
 Nino Salia (1898–1992), Georgian historian and philologist
 Salia Jusu-Sheriff (1929–2009), Sierra Leonean politician